Schistura nomi is a species of ray-finned fish, a stone loach, in the genus Schistura. This species is found in streams which have a moderate to fast current, in riffles, where the bed consists of gravel to stone in the Kong River in Laos. The specific name honours a Mr Nom who was the describer, Maurice Kottelat's, driver in Laos.

References

N
Taxa named by Maurice Kottelat
Fish described in 2000